Agalbursa (or Agalburga, Galbors), born 1148/55, died after 1186; was the daughter of Ponce de Cervera, viscount of Bas (a Catalan magnate), and Almodis, daughter of Raymond Berengar III of Barcelona. She married Barisone II of Arborea as his second wife. 

She was the mother of possibly one daughter, Susanna. 

Her stepdaughter Ispella married her brother Hugh I of Bas (c1150-c1179) and was the mother of Hugh I of Arborea. When Barisone died in 1186, Agalbursa signed a charter as Dei gratia Arboree Regina. She opposed her husband's eldest son by his first wife, Peter de Serra, and instead tried to impose her own nephew Hugh on the throne of Arborea with the help of her cousin Alfonso II of Aragon and the Republic of Genoa. 

She was possibly married secondly with the Catalan magnate, Ramon de Montcada, lord of Tortosa and Lleida.

Notes

Sources
Ghisalberti, Alberto M. (ed) Dizionario Biografico degli Italiani: VI Baratteri – Bartolozzi. Rome, 1964.
Moore, John C. "Pope Innocent III, Sardinia, and the Papal State." Speculum, Vol. 62, No. 1. (January 1987), pp 81–101.
Tola, Pasquale. Codex diplomaticus Sardiniae. Turin, 1868.

Judges (judikes) of Arborea
Italian untitled nobility
Medieval Catalan nobility
12th-century Catalan people
12th-century Spanish women
12th-century Italian nobility
12th-century Italian women
Medieval Catalan women